The 2018–19 season was Forest Green Rovers's 130th year in existence and their second consecutive season in League Two. Along with competing in League Two, the club participated in the FA Cup, EFL Cup and the EFL Trophy.

The season covers the period from 1 July 2018 to 30 June 2019.

Transfers

Transfers in

Transfers out

Loans in

Loans out

Competitions

Pre-season friendlies
FGR will play Brimscombe & Thrupp, Torquay United, Weston-super-Mare, Leeds United, Swindon Supermarine, Bristol Rovers, Hereford, Shortwood United and Wrexham in pre-season.

League Two

League table

Results summary

Results by matchday

Matches
On 21 June 2018, the League Two fixtures for the forthcoming season were announced.

Play-offs

FA Cup

The first round draw was made live on BBC by Dennis Wise and Dion Dublin on 22 October.

EFL Cup

On 15 June 2018, the draw for the first round was made in Vietnam. The second round draw was made from the Stadium of Light on 16 August.

EFL Trophy
On 13 July 2018, the initial group stage draw bar the U21 invited clubs was announced.

References

Forest Green Rovers F.C. seasons
Forest Green Rovers